Gran Hermano VIP 5 was the fifth season of the reality television Gran Hermano VIP series. The series was launched in January 2017 on Telecinco. Jordi González returned to host the series, as Sandra Barneda has been confirmed to be back as the host of the weekly Debate. Also, Lara Álvarez would be back to co-host directly from the house. The season premiered the 8th of January. The motto of this season is Enter as you can.

Housemates 
The first official housemates of the season were announced on the 28 of December, artist representative Toño Sanchís and host Irma Soriano. The rest of the housemates were confirmed in later days. In the first gala, they announced Tutto Duran, a former professional football player who now works as a glazier and has a passion for singing and songwriting, trying to break into the music scene. With the help of Alejandro Abad, he has to make the other housemates believe he's a Grammy nominated songwriter and a chart topper reggaeton artist in Latin America.
On 19 February, Aida Nizar entered the house as a new housemate.
On Day 50, a public poll was made in order for the public to decide if, Aylén Milla, Marco's girlfriend, should enter the game as a contestant.

Nominations table

Notes

Nominations total received

Debate: Blind results

Repechage 
The public voting will decide the top ex-housemates to officially return to the Gran Hermano VIP house as official housemates.

The repechage was officially announced on Day 40 (February 16, 2017). All the evicted housemates (Toño, Tutto, Alonso, Aída and Aless) are up for returning to the house.

Ratings

"Galas"

"Debates"

References

External links
 Official site on Telecinco.es
 Gran Hermano Main Site
 "Gran Hermano Vip 24 Hours"

Gran Hermano (Spanish TV series) seasons
Telecinco original programming
2017 Spanish television seasons